Sowmaeh-ye Olya (also Romanized as Şowma‘eh-ye ‘Olyā) is a village in Sarajuy-ye Sharqi Rural District, Saraju District, Maragheh County, East Azerbaijan Province, Iran. At the 2006 census, its population was 808, in 133 families.

References

External links

Towns and villages in Maragheh County